The 1974 Nicholls State Colonels football team represented Nicholls State University as a member of the Gulf South Conference (GSC) during the 1974 NCAA Division II football season. Led by first-year head coach Bill Clements, the Colonels compiled an overall record of 5–6 with a mark of 4–5 in conference play, placing seventh in the GSC. Nicholls State played home games at John L. Guidry Stadium in Thibodaux, Louisiana.

Schedule

References

Nicholls State
Nicholls Colonels football seasons
Nicholls State Colonels football